Hažín is a village and municipality in Michalovce District in the Kosice Region of eastern Slovakia.

History
In historical records the village was first mentioned in 1336.

Geography
The village lies at an altitude of 120 metres and covers an area of  (2020-06-30/-07-01).

Population 
It has a population of 479 people (2020-12-31).

Ethnicity
The population is about 100% Slovak in ethnicity.

Culture
The village has a small public library and food stores. It also has a car repair shop.

Sports
The village has a football pitch, fitness, tennis court and children's playground.

Transport
The nearest railway station is 12 kilometres away at Michalovce.

Genealogical resources

The records for genealogical research are available at the state archive "Statny Archiv in Presov, Slovakia"

 Roman Catholic church records (births/marriages/deaths): 1824-1912 (parish B)
 Greek Catholic church records (births/marriages/deaths): 1806-1913 (parish A)
 Reformated church records (births/marriages/deaths): 1747-1940 (parish B)

See also
 List of municipalities and towns in Slovakia

References

External links
http://www.statistics.sk/mosmis/eng/run.html 
Surnames of living people in Hazin

Villages and municipalities in Michalovce District